The Libertarian Party of Florida, or LPF, is the state of Florida's official affiliate with the Libertarian National Committee. The organization was founded in 1987 and its executive committee was incorporated in 2012.

Current Officers: Steven Nekhaila (Chair), Joshua Hlavka (Vice-Chair), Edward Appler (Secretary), Richard Perez (Treasurer), John Thompson (At-Large), Suzanne Gilmore (At-Large), & Hector Roos(At-Large).

Voter registration
Libertarian voter registration in the state of Florida has experienced significant growth.

Local chapters and affiliates
County affiliates:

 Alachua County
 Bay County
 Brevard County
 Broward County
 Clay County
 Charlotte County
 Duval County
 Escambia County
 Hillsborough County
 Lake County
 Lee County
 Manatee County
 Miami-Dade County
 Monroe County
 Okaloosa County
 Orange County
 Osceola County
 Palm Beach County
 Pinellas County
 Polk County
 Santa Rosa County
 Seminole County
 St Lucie
 Volusia County

Elections

2016 elections 

In 2016, the Libertarians held their first statewide primary, for US Senate. The race was between attorney Augustus Sol Invictus, who was controversial for his alt-right cultural views in addition to having sacrificed a goat and consumed its blood, to the point of then-chairman Adrian Wyllie resigning, and veteran Paul Stanton, who won by a nearly 50% margin.

2014 elections 
In 2014, the Libertarian Party ran their first state executive ticket, with Adrian Wyllie for governor, Greg Roe for lieutenant governor, and Bill Wohlsifer for attorney general. The Wyllie/Roe ticket garnered 3.8% of the vote, a record for the Libertarians in Florida. Wohlsifer got under that, with 2.9% of the vote. The highest percentage that the Wyllie/Roe ticket got in a county was in Citrus County, where they received 7% of the vote.

Down ballot, Lucas Overby got the second highest percentage a Libertarian has ever gotten in a house election, with 24.7% of the vote. Many people at the time attributed it to the lack of a Democrat on the ballot.

Statewide and Congressional Election Results

2010–2012 elections 
In 2010, the LPF had a statewide candidate on the ballot for the first time with Alexander Snitker for U.S. Senate.

In the 2012 election, Libertarian Party of Florida candidates included Calen Fretts for Florida's 1st congressional district, Peter Richter, Franklin Perez, and Jonathan Loesche for Florida House of Representatives. The LPF also had several candidates for county and municipal races statewide.

In 2012 the Libertarian Party of Florida was sued by Franklin Perez, the 2012 Libertarian candidate for the Florida State House of Representatives (District 28), for not refunding a candidate filing fee that political parties receive after the LPF de-vetted him and removed him from the party's state website. The courts awarded Perez $620.

Presidential nominee results 
Since 1972, the Libertarian Party has run a candidate for President of the United States. The candidate who has received the highest vote total in Florida was Gary Johnson in 2016. In every election year after 1984 the Libertarian Party has gained ballot access in Florida.

Elected public officials 
Past and present public officials from the Libertarian Party of Florida include:
 Randall Holcombe, Governor's Council of Economic Advisors, 2000–2006
 Scott McPherson, mayor, New Port Richey, 2008–2011
 Thomas W. Glaser, Governor's Holocaust Education Commission, 2004–
 Jared Grifoni, city council, Marco Island, 2016–
 Martin Sullivan, city council, Frostproof, 2015–
 Crystal Turner, city council, Hampton, 2014–
 Jamie Beckett, city commission, Winter Haven Seat 4, 2009–2013
 Dennis Lipp, town council, Loxahatchee Groves Seat 5, 2009–2011
 Gary Gerstein, community council, Fischer Island Seat 161-B, 2014–
 Keon A. Grayson, community council, North Central Seat 83, 2016–
 Marialexandra Garcia, Supervisor Community Development District, Islands at Doral III Seat 4, 2016–
 Marco Alvarez, Jr., Supervisor Community Development District, Century Gardens Village Seat 1, 2016–
 Kenneth Mertz, Port Authority Board, Fernandina Beach, 2002–2010
 Janet Hawkins, Port Authority Board, Seminole County, 1997–200
 Bob Rettie, Zoning Board Vice Chair, Fort Walton Beach, 2002–2006
 Steven A. Reid, Board of Adjustment Chairman, Gainesville, 2004–2010
 Michael Ferber, Board of Adjustment, Fort Lauderdale, 2002–2010
 Mark Clifford, Parks and Recreation Board, Seminole County, 2002–2004
 Matthew Bymaster, Soil and Water Board, Palm Beach County Soil and Water Group 2, 2016–
 Bruce Reichert, Soil and Water Board, Collier County Soil and Water Seat 1, 2015–
 Marc Tancer, Supervisor Soil and Water Board, Palm Beach Seat 1, 2015–
 Larry Frego, Soil and Water Conservation District, St. Johns County Group 2, 2010–2014
 Greg Gimbert, Soil and Water Board, Volusia County District 2, 2014–
 Ron Skrutski, Soil and Water Board, Lee County Seat 2, 2010–2014
 J. Adam Mitchell, Soil and Water Board, Collier County Seat 4, 2008–2012 
 Adam Mitchell, Soil and Water Board, Collier County Seat 4, 2008–2012
 Howard Horowitz, Soil and Water Board, Palm Beach County Seat 4, 2008–2012
 Jeff Hunt, Soil and Water Board, Duval County Seat 2, 2008–2012
 Jack Tanner, Soil and Water Board, Lee County Seat 4, 2008–2012
 Kim Hawk, Soil and Water Board, Lee County Seat 5, 2006–2010
 Tom Clark, Soil and Water Board, Lee County Seat 3, 2006–2010
 Bob Waterhouse, Soil and Water Board, Charlotte County, 2006–2014
 Frank Longo, Soil and Water Conservation Board Vice Chair, Palm Beach County Group 2, 2002–2008
 Phil Blumel, Soil and Water Board, Palm Beach County Seat 4, 2002–2008
 Michael Barr, Soil and Water Conservation District Chairman, Seminole County, 2002–2006
 Brad Cline, Soil and Water Board Secretary, Palm Beach County Seat 4, 2002–2008
 Leslee Berryman, Soil and Water Conservation District Secretary, Seminole County, 2002–2006
 Dean Concannon, Soil and Water Conservation District, Seminole County, 2002–2006
 Carol Morris, Fire District Board, Fort Myers Seat 3, 2014–
 Jim Culberson, Taxing District, Sebastian Inlet Area 5, 2004–2014
 Richard D. Paul, Mosquito Control District, Lee County Area 4, 2014–
 Tracy Lundquist, Hospital Authority, West Volusia County Group A Seat 1, 2008–2012

State Conventions

2015 
In 2015, the LPF convention was held in New Port Richey, Florida.

2016 
The 2016 state convention was held in West Palm Beach in April. During convention, state delegates voted in James Morris as treasurer, Suzanne Gilmore as secretary, and Russ Wood as director at Large (2) to their respective offices. State delegates also voted on individuals to send as delegates and alternate delegates to the Libertarian National Convention the following month in Orlando.

2017 
The LPF's 2017 convention was held May 5–7 in Cocoa Beach at the International Palms Resort. The offices of chair, vice chair, director at large seats 1 and 3 were up for election. Marcos Miralles of Miami-Dade County defeated Char-Lez Braden (Incumbent) in the chair's race. Omar Recuero (incumbent) of Broward County, defeated past chair (2013–2015) Dana Moxley-Cummings of Pasco County for the vice chair seat. Director-at-large seat 1 was contested between Alison Foxall (Incumbent) of Sarasota County, Thomas Knapp of Alachua County, and Steven Nekhaila of Monroe County. Alison Foxall defeated both. Director-at-large seat 3 was contested by newcomer Greg Peele Jr. of Orange County, and chair of Collier County Libertarian Party, Rob Tolp. Mr. Tolp was defeated by Greg Peele Jr. by a large margin.

2018 
The Libertarian Party of Florida's 2018 state convention was held in Fort Walton Beach, Fla, February 24–26.

2019 
The Libertarian Party of Florida's 2019 state convention was held in Tampa from May 3–5, 2019.

2020 
The Libertarian Party of Florida held its Annual Business Meeting and Convention in Orlando, Feb 21 to Feb. 23.

2021 
The Libertarian Party of Florida held its Annual Business Meeting and Convention in Lakeland, June 11 to Feb. 13.

2022 
The Libertarian Party of Florida held its Annual Business Meeting and Convention in Melbourne, Feb 25 to Feb. 27.

References

1987 establishments in Florida
Libertarian Party (United States) by state
Organizations based in Miami
Political parties in Florida
Political parties established in 1987